The magic minute, or leadership minute, is a custom in the United States House of Representatives that allows party leaders to speak for as long as they wish, in contrast with other members, who have to adhere to strict time limits. The convention was notably used by Nancy Pelosi and Kevin McCarthy in 2018 and 2021, respectively, to speak for records of over eight hours.

Background 
Speeches one minute in length are allowed before or after legislative sessions every day. The members are asked to stay within a 300 word limit. The speeches are granted with permission from the Speaker. 

The magic minute is distinct from the Senate filibuster. The House speaker, majority leader, and minority leader are accorded this privilege and their speeches are considered to have taken one minute, regardless of actual length. This has the effect of not taking up other members' allotted times. The House parliamentarian has advised in response to queries regarding time limits that "it is the custom of the House to hear the leader's remarks" and that party leaders had "used a customary amount of time" in answer to parliamentary inquiries about how much time had elapsed since they began speaking.

History
The custom has been used by leaders of both parties. Champ Clark, the minority leader in 1909, spoke for five hours and fifteen minutes against tax reforms; this was considered the record before 2018. In June 2009, minority leader John Boehner spoke for under two hours opposing an energy bill, the American Clean Energy and Security Act. In February 2018, Democratic minority leader Nancy Pelosi used the magic minute (calling it the "leadership minute") to speak for a then-record of eight hours and seven minutes, calling for legislation protecting DREAMers. Much of the speech was spent reading their letters; the feat was called "pretty darned impressive" by Republican Speaker of the House Paul Ryan, who highlighted her use of high heels throughout the speech.

In November 2021, minority leader Kevin McCarthy used the magic minute to speak for eight hours and thirty-two minutes, prior to the passage of President Joe Biden's Build Back Better bill. During the speech, McCarthy mentioned how he became a Republican partly because of President Jimmy Carter's use of sweaters and how baby carrots were "just big carrots. They chop 'em and they charge you more and you buy them." Other talking points included how he wished he "could have been in Tiananmen Square and... there knocking down the Berlin Wall", and how he could not "even afford to test drive a Tesla, and Elon is one of [his] best friends."

In the aftermath of McCarthy's speech, the longest in the House's modern history, White House Press Secretary Jen Psaki remarked that he did not talk about climate change or child care costs, despite the length of the speech.

See also
Procedures of the United States House of Representatives

Notes

References

External links
"The Majority Leader and the Minority Leader", Precedents of the U.S. House of Representatives (2017 series), Volume 1, chapter 

Parliamentary procedure
Terminology of the United States Congress
United States House of Representatives